The year 1902 in film involved some significant events.


Events
March 10 – A Circuit Court decision in the United States ends Thomas Edison's monopoly on the 35 mm movie film technology.
April 2 – Thomas Lincoln Tally opens the Electric Theater, the first permanent movie theater, in Los Angeles. Tally co-founds the First National Exhibitors Circuit in 1917.
August 9 – Georges Méliès' film The Coronation of Edward VII (a staged simulation with inserted actuality footage) is first shown in London on the evening of the Coronation itself.
September 1 – Actor/producer Méliès premières the first science fiction film, the silent A Trip to the Moon (Le Voyage dans La Lune), at the Théâtre Robert-Houdin in Paris, France; it proves an immediate success. One scene features the animated human face of the moon being struck in the eye by a rocket.
William Wardell invents an 11 mm amateur film format, Vitak.

Notable films released in 1902

Mitchell and Kenyon

 Bradford Coronation Procession
 Burnley v. Manchester United
 Comic Pictures in High Street, West Bromwich
 Dewsbury v. Manningham
 Electric Tram Rides from Forster Square, Bradford
 Employees Leaving Storey's Moor Lane Mill, Lancaster
 The Great Local Derby:  Accrington v. Church, Cricket Match
 Leeds Athletic and Cycling Club Carnival
 Lieutenant Clive Wilson and the Tranby Croft Party, Hull
 Living Wigan
 Sheffield United v. Bury
 Street Scenes in Halifax
 Tram Ride into Halifax
 Wexford Bull Ring
 Workers Leaving the Jute Works, Barrow

Edwin S. Porter
 Fun in a Bakery Shop
 Jack and the Beanstalk, based on the 1807 fairy tale by Benjamin Tabart

Ferdinand Zecca
 Ali Baba and the Forty Thieves (Ali Baba et les quarante voleurs), based on the Middle-Eastern folk tale
 Quo Vadis?, co-directed by Lucien Nonguet

Georges Méliès

 The Coronation of Edward VII (Le Sacre d'Édouard VII)
 Gulliver's Travels Among the Lilliputians and the Giants (Le Voyage de Gulliver à Lilliput et chez les Géants), based on the 1726 novel by Jonathan Swift
 The Treasures of Satan (Les Trésors de Satan)
 A Trip to the Moon (Le Voyage dans la Lune), based on the 1865 novel From the Earth to the Moon by Jules Verne
 Robinson Crusoe (Les aventures de Robinson Crusoë), based on the 1719 novel by Daniel Defoe

Others
 The Little Match Seller, directed by James Williamson, based on the 1845 fairy tale by Hans Christian Andersen – (GB)
 Ringling Brothers Parade Film, produced by William Selig – (US)
 Snow White, produced by Siegmund Lubin, based on the 1812 fairy tale by the Brothers Grimm – (US)
 Working Rotary Snow Plows, produced by Edison Studios – (US)

Births

Deaths
February 15 – Wilhelmina J. R. Albregt-Engelman, Dutch actress (born 1834)

References

 
Film by year